Vadakkunokkiyantram is a 1989 Indian Malayalam-language black comedy film written and directed by Sreenivasan who also stars in the film along with Parvathy. The film is about the marital discord caused by a husband's othello syndrome. The film won three Kerala State Film Awards, including Best Film. It was dubbed in Telugu as Sandeham and remade in Tamil as Dindigul Sarathy, in Kannada as Nanjangudu Nanjunda, and in Hindi as Main, Meri Patni Aur Woh.

Plot
Thalathil Dineshan, oversees a printing press. He struggles with insecurity due to his short stature and complexion. Following his marriage to Shobha, his life starts to spiral out of control. His wife is incredibly attractive and taller than him, which just adds to his insecurities. He overprotects his wife at first, which deteriorates his connection with his brother Prakashan. He perceives his brother's charm and humor as a challenge, which finally causes a family quarrel to break out.

Dineshan gradually employs strategies that, in his opinion, will help him win Shobha's respect and adoration. Thalakulam Sir, who he sees as a new confidante, offers him juvenile advise on how to win Shobha, his wife, over. He starts drinking because he sees it as a macho gesture. To make himself seem amusing, he memorizes jokes from a weekly magazine and repeats them to his wife. But all of his endeavors are futile, and he makes a fool of himself.

Shobha, a model wife, is wholly loyal to her husband and finds Dineshan's odd conduct to be perplexing. He has paranoid thoughts and begins to doubt his wife. He threatens the brother of Shobha's friend, whom he thinks is having an affair with her. As soon as Shobha discovers everything, events spiral out of his control. After a few events caused by acute paranoia, he is even sedated in a psychiatric hospital.

He seemed to have altered after a brief course of treatment. By promising her love and care, Dineshan is able to bring Shobha back to her house. Now that everything appears to be going well for them and while his wife is sleeping soundly, he begins to scan his backyard in the middle of the night for Shobha's stalker.

Cast

 Sreenivasan as Thalathil Dineshan
 Parvathy as Shobha
 Innocent as Thalakulam Sir
 K.P.A.C. Lalitha as Dineshan's Mother
 Baiju as Thalathil Prakashan, Dineshan's brother
 Lalu Alex as Capt. S. Balan
 C. I. Paul as Raghavan Nair, Shobha's father
 Usha as Thankamani, Dineshan's sister
 Bobby Kottarakkara as Sahadevan, worker at Dineshan's press
 Jagadish as Vinod Kumar Alleppey
 Nedumudi Venu as Doctor
 Lissy as Sarala, Shobha's friend
 Sankaradi as Thalathil Chanthu Nair, Dineshan's maternal uncle
 Mamukkoya as Photographer
 Oduvil Unnikrishnan as Policeman
 Sukumari as Shobha's Mother

Reception
The film was a critical as well as commercial success at the box office.

Legacy
Vadakkunokkiyantram is considered as one of the best Malayalam movies ever made. Dealing with the themes of insecurity, paranoia and inferiority complex, the movie was well appreciated for its poignant way of approaching such themes, intermixed with comedy. Some of the cringy jokes used by Dineshan for impressing his wife have become infamous as well as the photograph scene. The character names of Nivin Pauly and Nayanthara in Love Action Drama (2019) was based on this film.

Awards
 Kerala State Film Award for Best Film
 Kerala State Film Award for Best Music Director - Johnson
 Kerala State Film Award for Best Male Playback Singer - M. G. Sreekumar

References

External links
 

1989 films
Films with screenplays by Sreenivasan
1980s Malayalam-language films
Indian black comedy films
Films shot in Palakkad
Malayalam films remade in other languages
Films scored by Johnson